Shahrak-e Mohammad Hajji (also Romanized as Shahraḵ-e Moḩammad Ḩājjī) is a village in Salehabad Rural District, Salehabad County, Razavi Khorasan Province, Iran. As of the 2006 census, its population was 95, in 23 families.

References 

Populated places in Torbat-e Jam County